Haemanota concelata is a moth of the family Erebidae. It is found in French Guiana.

References

 Natural History Museum Lepidoptera generic names catalog

Haemanota
Moths described in 2005
Moths of South America